John Vaughan BD (d. 1499) was a Canon of Windsor from 1471 to 1499

Career

He was appointed:
Rector of St Mary Abchurch 1465 - 1499
Rector of Eastnor
Rector of Hanwell
Rector of Stoke-Lacy, Herefordshire

He was appointed to the fifth stall in St George's Chapel, Windsor Castle in 1471 and held the canonry until 1499.

Notes 

1499 deaths
Canons of Windsor
Year of birth unknown